Prayopavesa (IAST prāyopaveśanam, literally resolving to die through fasting) is a practice in Hinduism that denotes the death by fasting of a person who has no desire or ambition left, and no responsibilities remaining in life. It is also allowed in cases of terminal disease or great disability. A similar practice exists in Jainism, termed Santhara. In Tamil it is called Vatakkiruttal.

Conditions and rules
Committing Prayopavesa is bound by very strict regulations. Only a person who has no desire or ambition left, and no responsibilities remaining in life, is entitled to perform it. The decision to do so must be publicly declared well in advance. Ancient lawmakers stipulated the conditions that allow Prayopavesa; they are one's inability to perform normal bodily purification, death appears imminent or the condition is so bad that life's pleasures are nil, and the action is done under community regulation.

Examples
It was when the king Parikshit was observing Prayopavesa that the Bhagavata Purana was narrated to him by the sage Shuka, son of Vyasa. 
In 1967 Swatantryaveer Vinayak Damodar Sawarkar died of Prayopavesa.

In 1982, Acharya Vinoba Bhave (spiritual successor of Mahatma Gandhi) died by Prayopavesa. In October 2001, Satguru Sivaya Subramuniyaswami subjected himself to Prayopavesa. Subramuniyaswami was diagnosed to be suffering from  terminal intestinal cancer. He later died on the 32nd day of his fast on November 12.

On 11 January 1997 Swami Nirmalananda subjected himself to Prayopavesa.

See also
 Right to die
 Euthanasia
 Sokushinbutsu
 Catharist endura
 Sallekhana
 Hunger strike

References

General
 
 

Suicides by starvation
Hindu practices
Vrata
Religion and suicide
Religion and euthanasia
Suicide types